The 1979 Belgian motorcycle Grand Prix was the eighth round of the 1979 Grand Prix motorcycle racing season. It took place on the weekend of 29–1 July 1979 at the Circuit de Spa-Francorchamps.

Controversy
This race was notorious because the circuit of Spa had gotten a new layer of asphalt after the circuit's original length was reduced from 14.1 to 7 Kilometers, which was only finished two days before the start of the first free practices, which in turn caused a lot problems. The FIM had approved the new venue five weeks before the start of the grand prix, but when Kenny Roberts made a promotional visit to the track four weeks before the start of the race, he noted that the road surface did not have a top layer of asphalt and that no guard rails were placed yet.

During the free practices and qualifying, many riders fell off their bikes as a result. It turned out that a tar truck had spilled so much tar that even one of the steamrollers had slipped off the track that week, and that too much oil was also processed into the asphalt. As a response, the Belgian Minister of Public Works Guy Mathot mobilised many people of the Belgian Civil defense to clean up the slippery surface with fire brigade, brush and sweeper trucks all through the night. This however, did not help and top riders such as Roberts, Sheene, Ferrari and Hartog negotiated with the organisation and the FIM whether they should or should not ride this grand prix. On Saturday evening, the drivers gave a press conference in which they announced that they had nothing against the organization or the FIM, but that the circuit was not safe enough because too much oil was processed in the asphalt.

Eventually, all Factory teams boycotted the event after the Saturday qualifying due to the dangerous track conditions, which promptly enraged the tens of thousands of fans who already bought a ticket to see the race on Sunday. Once they found out about the decision, unrest and riots broke out. Angry fans tipped over cars and set them on fire, as well as the hay bales (which were lined up on the circuit as safety barriers for the riders) all through the night. Various fans had to be transported to the local hospital after various fights with the Belgian police had broken out.

Jack Middelburg and Boet van Dulmen originally were going to start the race because they believed that a track is also slippery when it's wet and because they didn't want to disappoint the many fans who came to see the race live, but when Dutch supporters of Wil Hartog, due to a lack of solidarity, threatened that they would throw beer bottles on the track when they would pass by, they also boycotted the race. In the end, Dennis Ireland would go on to win his only Motorcycle Grand Prix due to all the top racers not starting the race.

Aftermath
After the race, the FIM initially suspended Kenny Roberts and Virginio Ferrari as the largest "rioters" and the Belgian Motorcyclist Association suspended four drivers, but the FIM Committee for Safety, Sports Coordination and Competitions converted the suspension into a conditional suspension and a fine and the BMB followed that example. After the training sessions of the next Grand Prix in Sweden, the drivers issued a communiqué in which it was first reported that the fine would not be paid. In addition, a number of requirements were set for the 1980 season:
 Full travel and accommodation allowance for the races in the USA, Canada, Venezuela, Sweden, Finland and Spain.
 Additional safety measures at the Nürburgring, the Karlskoga Motorstadion, the Imatra Circuit and Spa-Francorchamps.
 Under no circumstances a possible Grand Prix of Switzerland, even if it was organized in another country.
 An increase of the minimum starting fee by 200%.
 Adequate press accommodation on all circuits.
 At the end of each season an election of three riders representatives in the CCR (Commission for Road Racing).
 On every circuit a decent (habitable) riders' quarter.

A few weeks later, 40 professional drivers, led by Kenny Roberts, presented a new organization and a new racing series: the "World Series of Motorcycle Racing". From the 1980 season onward the riders would not participate in any race organized by the FIM but only start in eight races with two classes: Formula 1 (500 cc) and Formula 2 (250 cc). The prize money was determined by the drivers. The idea did not last long: within a few weeks, Yamaha announced that he would side the FIM and, if necessary, to let Freddie Spencer race as a substitute for Roberts, and Roberts himself began to get doubts after Giacomo Agostini talked to him. Hard words were spoken during a press conference by Barry Sheene, Kenny Roberts and manager Barry Coleman. Roberts would never drive in FIM-Grands Prix again and all drivers who had signed in Silverstone for the World Series would go to court if they would start in FIM races. Those drivers were in turn tied to factory contracts and could be forced by the brands to drive for the FIM. At the beginning of the 1980 season it was already clear that the World Series could only be found under the umbrella of the FIM passage, and of course the FIM did not give permission. In a meeting, Wil Hartog was considered a coward because he did not want to sign for the World Series, but in the end Kenny Roberts, who was the instigator of all the fuss, had to bow his head. In fact, he even started at the Nürburgring in 1980, one of the circuits that had been deemed unsafe by the riders.

Furthermore, the problems with the asphalt persisted and the outcry of the disastrous 1979 race, prompted the FIM to switch the venue and race at the Circuit Zolder for the 1980 season. This however, was not a success and the chosen venue for the 1981 season was once again the Spa circuit.

Classification

500 cc

References

Belgian motorcycle Grand Prix
Motorcycle Grand Prix
Belgian